Nelson Fernández (born 29 August 1957) is a Cuban gymnast. He competed in seven events at the 1976 Summer Olympics.

References

1957 births
Living people
Cuban male artistic gymnasts
Olympic gymnasts of Cuba
Gymnasts at the 1976 Summer Olympics
Place of birth missing (living people)